WTVY (channel 4) is a television station in Dothan, Alabama, United States, affiliated with CBS. It is owned by Gray Television alongside low-power dual NBC/CW+ affiliate WRGX-LD (channel 23). The two stations share studios on North Foster Street in downtown Dothan; WTVY's transmitter is located in Bethlehem, Florida (in the Panama City market).

WTVY is used to provide full-market over-the-air coverage of WRGX-LD1 (simulcast over WTVY-DT4) and WRGX-LD2 (simulcast over WTVY-DT3); however, these simulcasts are not presently in high definition.

History
WTVY's first broadcast was on February 12, 1955, originally on channel 9, as a CBS affiliate. During the late-1950s, the station was also briefly affiliated with the NTA Film Network. In a massive reallocation of signals in Alabama and Georgia mandated by the Federal Communications Commission (FCC) to minimize signal interference, the station moved to channel 4 on November 2, 1960.

At the time, the tower was the tallest structure in the state of Alabama. WTVY-FM still utilizes the tower to transmit its signal. In the early 1970s, WTVY became one of the first stations in the country to broadcast 24 hours a day.

In 1978, WTVY moved to its current  (height above ground) tower in Bethlehem ( southwest of Dothan). The tower is the tallest structure in the state of Florida. The move was made in part to improve its signal in Panama City and along the Florida Gulf Coast, where it had been the default CBS affiliate since 1961.

The new tower gave WTVY one of the largest coverage areas in the Southeastern United States. It provides at least grade B coverage as far west as the Florida side of the Mobile/Pensacola market (including Fort Walton Beach and Destin) and as far northwest as the fringes of the Montgomery market.

In 1993, WTVY moved its studios to the historic Houston Hotel building in downtown Dothan (now known as the Woods Building) and operates on the first two floors. The news studio is actually located in what used to be the grand ballroom of the hotel. The building is tall enough (eight stories) that the station's studio-to-transmitter microwave dish is located on top of the building, not requiring a smaller tower to be built on the property.

For many years Charles Woods, a perennial aspirant to the governorship of Alabama and occasional minor-party presidential candidate, owned WTVY via Woods Communications Group; it is not to be confused with Woods Communications Corporation, a company owned by his son, David Woods, that owns WCOV-TV in Montgomery and formerly owned WDFX-TV in Dothan. In the early 1990s ownership of WTVY was transferred to Chemical Bank and operated under the corporate name of Dothan Holdings, LLC. Benedek Broadcasting bought WTVY from Chemical Bank/Dothan Holdings in 1995 for a price of $28 million. WTVY was one of the Benedek stations that was purchased by Gray Television in 2002.

For much of its history, WTVY doubled as the CBS affiliate for the Panama City market. Since Gray bought the station in 2002, WTVY has been a sister station to Panama City's NBC affiliate, WJHG-TV. WTVY's transmitter is technically located in the Panama City market even though it is only  from Dothan. In exchange, WJHG had long been available in Dothan on cable since the area did not have its own NBC affiliate.  This status ended on September 24, 2012 when Gray launched WECP-LD as a Panama City-based CBS affiliate. However, most cable systems in that market continued to carry WTVY in lieu of WECP until October when the latter replaced WTVY on area systems. Gray likewise launched WRGX-LD as a Dothan-based NBC affiliate on June 1, 2013 replacing WJHG and Montgomery's WSFA on area cable systems.

Programming
Syndicated programming includes Wheel of Fortune, Inside Edition, Rachael Ray, and Live with Kelly and Ryan among others. Wheel'''s sister game show, Jeopardy!, airs on NBC-affiliated WRGX, making Dothan one of the few markets to air both shows on separate stations. When Panama City relied on WTVY for a CBS station, all syndicated programming that was duplicated on WJHG and ABC outlet WMBB was still shown on WTVY on Panama City's cable systems. This is in contrast to SyndEx laws which gives local stations the option to restrict importing of syndicated programming that is already available on an in-market station. After WECP replaced WTVY, the former station is able to air shows that WJHG cannot and does not have to rely on an out-of-market station to fill an affiliation slot.

News operation

WTVY has historically been a ratings powerhouse in the Wiregrass Region winning every time slot. This is partly because its only local competition, ABC affiliate WDHN, has a coverage area only half as large and does not produce newscasts on weekends. Although Fox outlet WDFX-TV also airs local news, most coverage focuses on other areas of Alabama (it simulcasts a weekday morning show from WBRC in Birmingham; there is also an hour-long weekday program at 4 p.m. and a nightly half-hour prime time newscast at 9 p.m. from WSFA in Montgomery). During the prime time broadcast on WDFX, there is limited coverage of the Wiregrass provided by WSFA reporters based in Dothan.

On weekdays, WTVY produces two thirty-minute newscasts (at 4 and 5:30 p.m.) that are exclusive to WRGX. As a result, the NBC station airs NBC Nightly News on tape delay at 6 p.m. unlike most NBC outlets in the Central Time Zone. The WRGX news programs broadcast from a secondary set at the North Foster Street facility. Although it features additional reporters from WTVY, the NBC station maintains separate news anchors and a meteorologist. It does not simulcast any newscasts from WTVY.

Since WJHG and WTVY had traditionally been available on cable in both Dothan and Panama City, and since both stations have the same ownership, WJHG has run WTVY stories that take place in those parts of northwestern Florida that are in northern part of the Panama City market. Meanwhile, WTVY has run WJHG stories focusing on Panama City and the coast. Sometimes, WTVY will run its own stories on Panama City that WJHG did not cover.

The building that WTVY broadcasts from in Downtown Dothan also has a Doppler weather radar dome that is specifically made for the station. On June 4, 2012, WTVY became the first station in the Dothan market to broadcast local newscasts in high definition. One notable former personality of WTVY is Mitch English who was a weather anchor and news reporter at the station. He was a co-host of the nationally syndicated weekday morning show, The Daily Buzz'', from 2002 until 2012.

Subchannels
The station's digital signal is multiplexed:

See also
Channel 4 virtual TV stations in the United States
Channel 10 branded TV stations in the United States
Channel 36 digital TV stations in the United States

References

External links
 WTVY.com - Official WTVY-TV Website
 WRGX-LD2/WTVY-DT3 "Dothan's CW"

CBS network affiliates
MeTV affiliates
Circle (TV network) affiliates
Gray Television
Television channels and stations established in 1955
TVY (TV)
1955 establishments in Alabama